McLennan Community College (MCC) is a public community college in McLennan County, Texas.  Located in Waco, Texas, it opened in 1965.  MCC now serves about 9,000 students and has more than 700 employees. It is governed by a Board of Trustees elected from single-member districts in the county.

History 
The college opened in 1965.

Campus 
McLennan is one of three colleges in Waco along with Baylor University and Texas State Technical College.

The campus was recently expanded to include three new buildings, which were built with funding from a bond passed by voters in November 2006: the Michaelis Academic Center, New Science Building and Emergency Services Education Center.

MCC’s campus also includes the Bosque River Stage, a 530-seat amphitheater located along the banks of the Bosque River. This outdoor venue was renovated in 2001 to expand the stage and update the lighting, sound and concessions area.

Organization and administration 
As defined by the Texas Legislature, the official service area of McLennan Community College consists of the following:
all of McLennan and Falls Counties, and
the Calvert and Bremond school districts.

Academics 
MCC offers two-year associate degrees in arts and sciences for students who want to transfer to four-year schools. The school also has training programs—-two-year associate degrees in applied science and one-year certificates—-for students who want to enter the workforce. The school also offers continuing education courses for community members.

In addition, the University Center at MCC is a partnership with several four-year state universities that offer degree programs on MCC’s campus. It offers students the opportunity to earn affordable bachelor’s, master’s and doctoral degrees without leaving Central Texas. Partner universities are Midwestern State University, Tarleton State University, University of Texas Medical Branch, The University of Texas at Brownsville, and Texas Tech University.

Student life 
Through the McLennan Distinguished Lecture Series MCC brings nationally known figures to Waco to give free lectures to the community. Started in 2004, the program has attracted such notable speakers as author Tamim Ansary, Nobel prize-winner James Watson, Bill Nye “The Science Guy,” former U.S. Secretary of Labor Robert Reich, John Maxwell, Ben Carson, and current Associate Justice of the Supreme Court of the United States Clarence Thomas.

Sports 
The school has several student organizations and athletic teams. The mascot is a Scottish Highlander; the men's athletic teams are referred as the Highlanders, and the women's teams are the Highlassies. MCC's athletics program includes men's and women's basketball, baseball, softball, and men's and women's golf. There is also a dance team

Notable alumni 
 Jay Buhner, former Major League Baseball (MLB) player 
 Ruthie Foster, singer-songwriter of blues and folk music
 Emily Gimble, 2020 Texas State musician
 Sean Henn, former MLB player 
 Vinnie Johnson, former NBA player
 Danny Kaspar, former head basketball coach at Texas State University
 Pat Listach, former MLB player 
 Sean Lowe, former MLB player 
 Chris Martin, MLB player
 Craig McMurtry, former MLB player
 Ryan Merritt, former MLB player
 Rodrick Monroe, former NFL player
 Logan Ondrusek, former MLB  player
 Ken Patterson, former MLB  player
 Leonard Perry, college basketball coach
 Richie Ramsay, European Tour professional golfer 
 Jason Scobie, former professional baseball player
 Sons of the Desert, the late 1990s country music group
 Dave van Horn, former professional baseball player and college baseball coach
 Sam Worthen, former NBA player

References

 
Community colleges in Texas
Education in McLennan County, Texas
Education in Waco, Texas
Educational institutions established in 1965
Two-year colleges in the United States
Universities and colleges accredited by the Southern Association of Colleges and Schools
NJCAA athletics
1965 establishments in Texas